Low Alemannic German is a branch of Alemannic German, which is part of Upper German. Its varieties are only partly intelligible to non-Alemannic speakers.

Subdivisions
Lake Constance Alemannic (de)
Northern Vorarlberg (de)
Allgäu dialect (de)
Baar dialect
Southern Württemberg
Upper Rhenish Alemannic (de)
Basel German
Baden dialects north of Markgräflerland
Alsatian, spoken in Alsace, in some villages of the Phalsbourg county in Lorraine and by some Amish in Indiana
Low Alemannic dialects in the Black Forest 
Colonia Tovar dialect, Venezuela

Features
The feature that distinguishes Low Alemannic from High Alemannic is the retention of Germanic /k/, for instance kalt 'cold' vs. High Alemannic chalt.

The feature that distinguishes Low Alemannic from Swabian is the retention of the Middle High German monophthongs, for instance Huus 'house' vs. Swabian Hous or Ziit 'time' vs. Swabian Zejt.

Orthography
(All of the below is specific to the dialects spoken near Freiburg im Breisgau)

Vowels:

Consonants:

Are as in Standard German, with the following notes:
 kh is an aspirated 
 ng is a velar nasal 
 ngg is a velar nasal followed by a velar plosive 
 ph is an aspirated 
 th is an aspirated 
 z represents  as opposed to Standard German

Articles 
Definite Article

Indefinite Article

Substantives 

Plurals
Class I: Plural = Singular  (e.g. Ääber → Ääber)
Class II: Plural = Singular + Umlaut (e.g. Baum → Baim; Vader → Väder)
Class IIIa: Plural = Singular + -e (e.g. Man → Mane; Ags → Agse)
Class IIIb: Plural = Singular + -̈e (e.g. Frosch → Fresche)
Class IVa: Plural = Singular + -er (e.g. Lyyb → Lyyber; Schùg → Schùger)
Class IVb: Plural = Singular + -̈er (e.g. Wald → Wälder; Blad → Bleder)
Class V: No Plural (e.g. Chees; Zemänd)
Class VI: No Singular (Plural Only) (e.g. Bilger; Fèèrine)

Diminutives
Standard ending is -li (e.g. Aimer → Aimerli)
If the word ends in -l, then the ending is -eli (e.g. Dääl → Dääleli)
If the word ends in -el, then the ending is -i (e.g. Degel → Degeli)
If the word ends in -e, remove the -e and add -li (e.g. Bèère → Bèèrli)
The rules for this can be quite complex and depend on the region. Sometimes diminutives require umlaut, other times not.

Adjectives 

Weak Declension

Strong Declension

Comparative
 Standard ending -er (e.g. fèin --> fèiner)

Superlative
 Standard ending -(e)schd (e.g. fèin --> fèinschd)

Irregular

Pronouns 
Personal Pronouns

Verbs 

1. Infinitive

Infinitive ends in -e
Some monosyllabic verbs do not have this ending (e.g. chùù, döe, goo, gschää, haa, loo, nee, sää, schdoo, schlaa, syy, zie, etc.)

2. Participle

2.1 Prefix 
The prefix for g- or ge-
Before b, d, g, bf, dsch, and z is merged into the word and not visible (e.g. broochd, glaubd, etc.)
2.2 Suffix
Strong Verbs end in -e (e.g. gäse, glofe)
Weak Verbs end in -d or -ed (e.g. bùzd, gchaufd)

2.3 Types

2.3.1  Infinitive and Present Sg y/èi/ai - Participle i 
2.3.1.1 y > i (e.g. abwyyse > abgwiise) 
2.3.1.2 èi > i (e.g. verzèie > verziie) 
2.3.1.3 ai > i (e.g. schaide > gschiide) 
2.3.2 Infinitive and Present Sg ie/u/au/èi/i - Participle o/öu/öe  
2.3.2.1 ie > o (e.g. biede > bode) 
2.3.2.2 u > o (e.g. sufe > gsofe) 
2.3.2.3 au > o (e.g. laufe > glofe) 
2.3.2.4 èi > öu (e.g. rèie > gröue) 
2.3.2.5 ie > öe (e.g. riefe > gröefe) 
2.3.2.5 i > o (e.g. wiige > gwooge) 
2.3.3 Infinitive and Present Sg i - Participle ù 
2.3.3.1 i > u (e.g. binde > bùnde) 
2.3.4 Infinitive ä/e - Present i - Participle o/u  
2.3.4.1 ä - i - o (e.g. bräche > broche) 
2.3.4.2 ä - i - u (e.g. hälfe > ghùlfe) 
2.3.4.3 e/è - i - o (e.g. verdèèrbe > verdoorbe) 
2.3.4.4 e - i - ù (e.g. schmelze > gschmùlze) 
2.3.5 Infinitive ä/i - Present i - Participle ä 
2.3.5.1 ä - i - ä (e.g. äse > gäse) 
2.3.5.2 i - i - ä (e.g. bide > bäde) 
2.3.6 Infinitive Vowel is the same as the Participle  
2.3.5.1 (e.g. bache > bache; fale > gfale) 

3. Conjugation 
3.1 Present Tense
3.1.1 Regular Verb

Numbers

References

Swiss German language
Languages of Austria
Languages of Germany
German dialects